Saida Kanosovna Gunba (30 August 1959 in Sukhumi, Georgian SSR – 24 November 2018 in Pitsunda, Abkhazia) was a Soviet javelin thrower. Gunba was affiliated with Burevestnik Tbilisi.

She competed for the USSR at the 1980 Summer Olympics held in Moscow, where she won the silver medal in the women's javelin competition. She also finished fifth at the 1979 IAAF World Cup.

Her personal best throw was 68.28 metres with the old javelin type, achieved in 1980.

References 

1959 births
2018 deaths
Soviet female javelin throwers
Female javelin throwers from Georgia (country)
Olympic silver medalists for the Soviet Union
Athletes (track and field) at the 1980 Summer Olympics
Olympic athletes of the Soviet Union
Sportspeople from Sukhumi
Medalists at the 1980 Summer Olympics
Olympic silver medalists in athletics (track and field)
Burevestnik (sports society) athletes